KEVE-LD, virtual channel 36 (UHF digital channel 31), is a low-powered television station licensed to Vancouver, Washington, United States. Owned by Better Life Television, the station is a translator of 3ABN affiliate KBLN-TV (channel 30) in Grants Pass, Oregon.

On August 8, 2006, the station was granted a construction permit to begin converting operations to digital television with 15 kW on Channel 36.

On March 23, 2009, KEVE-LP went off the air due to a lack of available programming. The station was granted a construction permit to relocate the station to the Portland-Vancouver area.

On March 23, 2010, the FCC granted Consent to Assignment for KEVE-LP from Fiori Media, Inc. to the Southern Oregon Conference Assn. of Seventh-Day Adventists.

On October 24, 2010, KEVE-LD went on the air.

Translator stations

 K26HS  Channel  26 Tillamook
 K42IR  Channel  42 Astoria

See also
KBLN-TV
KTVC
Media ministries of the Seventh-day Adventist Church

External links

Television stations in Washington (state)
Television channels and stations established in 2010
2010 establishments in Washington (state)
Low-power television stations in the United States
Seventh-day Adventist media